The Free Women's Units (Kurdish: Yekîneyên Jinên Azad ên Star), shortened from the Kurdish name as YJA STAR, is the women's military wing of the Kurdistan Workers' Party (PKK). YJA STAR operates according to jineology, the feminist philosophy developed by the Kurdish ideological leader, Abdullah Öcalan.

See also
Gulîstan, Land of Roses, a 2016 documentary film about women PKK fighters

References

All-female military units and formations
Apoist organizations in Turkey
Anti-ISIL factions in Turkey
Kurdish organisations
Kurdistan Workers' Party
Left-wing militant groups in Turkey
Military wings of socialist parties
Rebel groups in Turkey
Women's organizations based in Turkey
Women's rights in Kurdistan